Scarce is a surname. Notable people with the surname include:

 Kevin Scarce (born 1952), Royal Australian Navy admiral
 Mac Scarce (born 1949), American baseball player
 Michael Scarce (21st century), American writer, researcher, and advocate
 Yhonnie Scarce (born 1973), Australian glass artist